Stanisław Malczyk (28 February 1910 – 13 February 1973) was a Polish footballer. He played in three matches for the Poland national football team from 1932 to 1935.

References

External links
 

1910 births
1973 deaths
Polish footballers
Poland international footballers
Place of birth missing
MKS Cracovia (football) players
Association football forwards